Ranunculus chius is a species of plant in the family Ranunculaceae.

References 

chius
Flora of Malta